Razowskiina is a genus of moths belonging to the family Tortricidae.

Species
Razowskiina elcedranus (Razowski & Wojtusiak, 2010)
Razowskiina eurydice (Butler, 1883)
Razowskiina fortunearia (Razowski, 1991)
Razowskiina glochina (Razowski & Becker, 1991)
Razowskiina glomerula (Razowski & Becker, 1991)
Razowskiina psychotria (Razowski & Becker, 1991)
Razowskiina psydra (Razowski & Becker, 1991)
Razowskiina ptilota (Razowski & Becker, 1991)
Razowskiina senilis (Razowski, 1987)

References

 , 2005: Nomenclatural notes on various taxa of the moths (Lepidoptera). Centre for Entomological Studies Ankara, Miscellaneous Papers 91/92: 11-14.
 , 1987: New taxa of Archipini genus (Lepidoptera: Tortricidae) from South America. Tinea Suppl.: 123-138.
 , 1991: Descriptions of new Neotropical Tortricinae from the Übersee-Museum, Bremen (Lepidoptera: Tortricidae). Shilap Revista de Lepidopterologia 19 (74): 137-143.
 , 1991: Brazilian species of Silenis Razowski, 1987 (Lepidoptera: Tortricidae). Shilap Revista de Lepidopterologia 19 (74): 145-152.
 , 2010: Tortricidae (Lepidoptera) from Peru. Acta Zoologica Cracoviensia 53B (1-2): 73-159. . Full article: .

External links
tortricidae.com

Euliini
Tortricidae genera